Stefano Ianni (born 31 January 1981) is an Italian professional tennis player. 

Ianni competed mainly on the ATP Challenger Tour and ITF Futures, both in singles and doubles. He reached his highest ATP singles ranking, No. 300 on 11 June 2007, and his highest ATP doubles ranking, No. 118, on 6 May 2014.

ATP Challenger and ITF Futures finals

Singles: 14 (5–9)

Doubles: 38 (22–16)

References

External links
 
 

1981 births
Living people
Italian male tennis players
21st-century Italian people